Kjell-Åke Lennart "Sörmarkarn" Nilsson (born 5 April 1942) is a retired Swedish high jumper. He competed at the 1960 and 1964 Summer Olympics and at the 1966 European Athletics Championships and finished in seventh, sixth and eighth place, respectively. Nilsson won a bronze medal at the 1966 European Indoor Games and became a Swedish champion outdoors in 1963 and indoors in 1966.

References

1942 births
Living people
Swedish male high jumpers
Olympic athletes of Sweden
Athletes (track and field) at the 1960 Summer Olympics
Athletes (track and field) at the 1964 Summer Olympics